Seuula Ioane Tuuau (born ~1957) is a Samoan politician and Cabinet Minister. He is a member of the FAST Party.

Seuula is from the village of Tufutafoe. He is a former school teacher and principal, and served as principal of Tufutafoe Primary School for 20 years. He was first elected to the Legislative Assembly of Samoa in the April 2021 Samoan general election, defeating Ali'imalemanu Alofa Tuuau. When Tuuau was declared elected under the women's quota on 20 April 2021, he was a party to the court challenge which saw her appointment overturned.

On 24 May 2021 he was appointed Minister of Education, Sports and Culture in the elected cabinet of Fiamē Naomi Mataʻafa. The appointment was disputed by the caretaker government. On 23 July 2021 the Court of Appeal ruled that the swearing-in ceremony was constitutional and binding, and that FAST had been the government since 24 May.

In October 2021 he graduated from the National University of Samoa with a Bachelors of Education.

Notes

References

Living people
People from Vaisigano
Members of the Legislative Assembly of Samoa
Government ministers of Samoa
Education ministers of Samoa
Faʻatuatua i le Atua Samoa ua Tasi politicians
Samoan educators
1957 births
National University of Samoa alumni